The Brides in the Bath is a 2003 television film by Yorkshire Television for ITV, based on the life and trial of British serial killer and bigamist George Joseph Smith, the "Brides in the Bath Murderer". Martin Kemp plays the role of Smith, and Richard Griffiths plays barrister Sir Edward Marshall-Hall. The film was directed by Harry Bradbeer, and written by Glenn Chandler.

Production
Set to portray coastal Weymouth, filming took place in Yorkshire locations of Bridlington, Filey and Scarborough from June to mid-July, 2003. Bradford City Hall in Bradford, doubled for the court room and holding cells of the Old Bailey in the City of London.

Plot
The film focuses on the trial of George Smith and flashbacks showing how he met each of his wives. Smith is married to his wife Edith. He often goes away on the pretext of business. Whilst he is away he meets wealthy women, marries them within a few weeks, insures their lives and then drowns them in the bath. He returns with the insurance money (sometimes he brings the latest victims' possessions to Edith as gifts). He is eventually arrested and ultimately hanged for his crimes. At the trial it is revealed that his marriage to Edith is bigamous; in total he had eight wives, most of which he left after stealing all of their possessions.

Cast

 Martin Kemp as George Joseph Smith
 Richard Griffiths as Sir Edward Marshall-Hall
 Charlotte Randle as Bessie Mundy
 Emma Ferguson as Alice Burnham
 Jennifer Calvert as Caroline Thornhill
 Susan Brown as Mrs Crossley
 Carolyn Backhouse as Margaret Lofty
 Tracey Wilkinson as Edith Smith
 Peter Wight as Charles Burnham
 Joanna David as Elizabeth Burnham
 James Woolley as Mr Archibald Bodkin
 Howard Gay as Montague Shearman
 Philip Voss as Mr Justice Scrutton
 Lisa Ellis as Maisy Crossley
 Alan McKenna as DI Arthur Neil
 Ian Connaughton as Travers Humphreys
 Anthony Calf as Howard Mundy
 Timothy Kightley as Mr Wilkinson
 Philip Bowen as Dr French
 Ian Barritt as Dr Billing
 Helen Ryan as Mrs Farraday
 Joanna Wake as Louise Blatch
 Stephanie Fayerman as Miss Rapley
 Naomi Allisstone as Ellen Stanley
 Ed Waters as DS Page
 Robert Calvert as Police Constable
 Tim Beasley as Clerk of the Court
 John Banfield as Jury Foreman
 Joanna Booth as Bessie's Companion
 Corinne Handforth as Bessie's Companion

References

External links
 
 
The Brides in the Bath DVD at Amazon

2003 television films
2003 films
British television films
ITV crime shows
Television series by Yorkshire Television
Television series by ITV Studios
Films directed by Harry Bradbeer
Films shot in Bradford
Television shows shot in Bradford
Films shot in Bridlington
Television shows shot in Bridlington
Films shot in Scarborough
Television shows shot in Scarborough